The Akkar plain foothills are the location of several surface archaeological sites found between Halba and Adbe in Akkar Governorate, Lebanon.

The sites were found in neogene conglomerates above the  contour on Louis Dubertret's geological map and mentioned by R. Wetzel and J. Haller in 1945. The materials found were described as "Gros bifaces" along with other roughouts. The tools were originally classified as Chelleo-Acheullean however Lorraine Copeland suggested them reclassified as a Heavy Neolithic assemblage of the Qaraoun culture in light of more modern research.

References

Akkar District
Archaeological sites in Lebanon
Heavy Neolithic sites
Neolithic settlements